Gare Centrale (French for Central Station) may refer to:

 Gare Centrale (Brussels)
 Gare Centrale (Montreal)
 Gare Centrale (Mulhouse)